One Night Only is a series of professional wrestling events held by Impact Wrestling in 2019 and streaming on their Global Wrestling Network service. 2019 was the final year of the One Night Only series as it would be retired and succeeded by the Impact Plus Monthly Specials, seen on GWN's own successor, Impact Plus.

New Beginnings

One Night Only: New Beginnings was a professional wrestling event produced by Impact Wrestling in conjunction with Pennsylvania Premiere Wrestling to be released exclusively on Global Wrestling Network.

Clash in the Bluegrass

One Night Only: Clash in the Bluegrass was a professional wrestling event produced by Impact Wrestling in conjunction with Ohio Valley Wrestling to be released exclusively on Global Wrestling Network.

References

2019 in professional wrestling
Events in Pennsylvania
Professional wrestling in Pennsylvania
2019 in Pennsylvania
Impact One Night Only